Daviesia articulata is a species of flowering plant in the family Fabaceae and is endemic to the south-west of Western Australia. It is a rigid, low-lying or erect shrub with scattered, tapering, cylindrical and sharply pointed phyllodes, and yellow and red flowers.

Description

Taxonomy and naming
Daviesia articulata was first formally described in 1995 by Michael Crisp in Australian Systematic Botany from specimens collected east of Ravensthorpe in 1979. The specific epithet (articulata) means "jointed", referring to the base of the phyllode.

Distribution and habitat
This species of pea mainly grows in woodland or mallee in the area between Kellerberrin, Kojonup, the Stirling Range and Salmon Gums in the Avon Wheatbelt, Coolgardie, Esperance Plains, Jarrah Forest and Mallee biogeographic regions in the south-west of Western Australia.

Conservation status
Daviesia articulata is classified as "not threatened" by the Government of Western Australia Department of Biodiversity, Conservation and Attractions.

References

articulata
Eudicots of Western Australia
Plants described in 1995
Taxa named by Michael Crisp